Qotbiyeh (also Romanized as Qoţbīyeh; also known as Qoţbīyeh-ye Aḩshām) is a village in Najafabad Rural District, in the Central District of Sirjan County, Kerman Province, Iran. At the 2006 census, its population was 16, in 4 families.

References 

Populated places in Sirjan County